Saint Vincent and the Grenadines made its debut at the 11th Pan American Games in Havana, Cuba from August 2 to August 18, 1991.

Athletics

Saint Vincent and the Grenadines sent six track and field athletes.
Eswort Coombs
Dexter Browne
Eversley Linley
Kent Dennie
Bigna Samuel
Yvette Haynes

Table tennis

Saint Vincent and the Grenadines sent four table tennis athletes.

Sharon Bailey
Sean Stanley
Joseph Carrington
Truman Quashie

See also
Saint Vincent and the Grenadines at the 1992 Summer Olympics

References

Nations at the 1991 Pan American Games
Pan American Games
1991